HAFB may refer to:

 Hamilton Air Force Base, California, United States
 Hanscom Air Force Base, Massachusetts, United States
 Hickam Air Force Base, Hawaii, United States
 Hill Air Force Base, Utah, United States
 Holloman Air Force Base, New Mexico, United States